The B-Line is a railroad line owned and operated by the Norfolk Southern Railway in the U.S. state of Virginia. The most heavily-used section of the line runs from Front Royal east to Manassas along a former Southern Railway line. The B-Line extends west into Strasburg, although no trains serve that part of the branch anymore, as it possibly will be turned into a rail-trail. Its east end is at the Washington District, and it crosses the Hagerstown District at Front Royal. Since the 1999 breakup of Conrail, when Norfolk Southern acquired the Lurgan Branch from the north end of the Hagerstown District into Pennsylvania, the B-Line east of Front Royal has been a major connection, allowing traffic on the Washington District to bypass Washington, D.C. The B-Line supports mainly intermodal and manifest trains, although beginning in late 2018, Norfolk Southern began running rerouted coal unit trains on it more frequently than before.

History
The Manassas Gap Railroad opened in 1854 from Manassas to Strasburg. It became part of the Southern Railway and Norfolk Southern through leases and mergers.

References

Norfolk Southern Railway lines
Rail infrastructure in Virginia
Southern Railway (U.S.)